Udryak (Öyźöräk) is a rural locality (a village) in Safarovsky Selsoviet, Chishminsky District, Bashkortostan, Russia. The population was 431 as of 2010. There are 5 streets.

Geography 
Udryak is located 20 km southwest of Chishmy (the district's administrative centre) by road. Kushkuak is the nearest rural locality.

References 

Rural localities in Chishminsky District